aswekeepsearching (often abbreviated as AWKS; pronounced “As We Keep Searching”) is an Indian post-rock band formed in Ahmedabad, Gujarat in September 2013 as a home studio project by vocalist & guitarist Uddipan Sarmah and ex-guitarist & keyboardist Shubham Gurung. They have released four studio albums and two EPs.

The band has shared the stage with notable acts such as  Incubus, Fever 333,  Textures,  Caspian, God Is an Astronaut, Steven Wilson, 65daysofstatic, pg.lost, Tides of Man, sleepmakeswaves, The Contortionist, Plini, Katy Perry, Dua Lipa and many more. Their fresh & emotive approach to the post-rock genre followed by their live performances have achieved notable success in India and internationally.

Career

2013-2014: Formation, early years and Growing Suspicions
In September 2013, the band was started as a home studio project by vocalist & guitarist Uddipan Sarmah and keyboardist & guitarist Shubham Gurung in Ahmedabad, Gujarat. The band released their debut EP, Growing Suspicions  in February 2014 featuring 6 tracks and 2 bonus tracks. Uddipan and Shubham were joined by their friends Ashwin Naidu on the drums and Tushar Verma on the bass to play a couple of live shows in their home city.

2015-2016: Khwaab and Russia Tour

The year 2015, saw them come together as a live act, with Robert Alex and Gautam Deb from a prominent Pune based experimental metal band Noiseware, and this ultimately led to the launch of aswekeepsearching's first full-length release titled ‘Khwaab’ (meaning “Dream”). Noiseware's guitarist/producer Adhiraj Singh tracked the album at Refractor Studio in Pune and joined the band as their live sound engineer. The release of ‘Khwaab’ was the moment that led to the start of a change in the Indian independent music circuit. With the music spreading like wildfire owing to its fresh and emotive approach, the band redefined the touring culture in India; taking their music to a multitude of cities locally and also embarking on their first-ever overseas 5-city Russian Tour where the band performed in Saint Petersburg, Moscow, Kazan, Ekaterinburg and last show once again in Moscow.

2017-2018: Zia and Europe Tour

The extensive touring schedule of ‘Khwaab’ brought them their sophomore record ‘Zia’ (meaning “Light”) – an eleven-track album birthed from the shared experiences of the band. ‘Zia’ saw the light of the day in April 2017 and gained appreciation from critics & fans alike. Expanding the sonic landscape, the band collaborated with like-minded artists on select songs, introducing Indian instrumentation such as Tabla, Sitar into their already diverse soundscape. This made for a unique and enthralling listening experience for a global audience – setting a standard for Modern Post-Rock. Prior to the release of the album, Uddipan hosted a ‘Zia // Storytelling & Listening Session Tour’ where he visited 13 cities and hosted a listening session to a select number of fans. The sessions were held in living rooms and jam pads. Post-release, the band went on to extensively tour - from selling out venues on their album launch tour to performing at premiere music festivals in India such as NH7 Weekender and VH1 Supersonic.
In May 2018, the band embarked on their second overseas 15 City tour across Europe with shows at notable post-rock outings like dunk! Festival (Belgium) & Pelagic Fest (Germany), the band made a lasting impression on Europe. After returning from Europe, the band did a 7 city Homecoming tour where they covered cities like Delhi, Bangalore, Mumbai, Pune, Hyderabad, Guwahati and Shillong.

2019: Rooh, Sambit’s entry in the band and the Rooh India Tour

In May 2019, the band embarked on a 5 city tour covering Mumbai, Delhi, Pune, Bangalore and Kolkata. Later in July, after 4 years of being together, Gautam Deb left the band after finishing the drum tracking for the third album. The band's longtime friend & collaborator Sambit Chatterjee joined the band as the drummer. Prior to the release of the album, Uddipan once again hosted an album listening session and this time covered 20 cities. Finally, ‘Rooh’ (meaning ‘Soul’), an 8-song album was released in September 2019. The band then went on to tour 9 cities across India covering cities like Guwahati, Shillong, Mumbai, Hyderabad, Delhi, Bangalore, Kolkata, Kohima and Pune; promoting their latest full-length Rooh, headlined numerous college festivals at prestigious institutions like the IITs, and also performed at the debut edition of the OnePlus Music Festival held at DY Patil Stadium, Mumbai in November, where they got to share the stage with the likes of Amit Trivedi, Dua Lipa and Katy Perry.

2020-present: Sleep
While travelling to different cities for their performances, work on new music had already begun. In December 2019, the band laid the foundations for their next full-length release, in which they wanted to touch on the topic of Mental health and its importance. In January 2020 they began the recording and pre-production process for the album ‘Sleep’, set to release on the 17th of April 2020. The release of Sleep also saw the parting of ways with guitarist Shubham Gurung, as he wanted to focus his energies on his spiritual path. In July 2020, the band spearheaded the campaign #foryourmind where they collaborated with independent artists like Hanita Bhambri, Raghav Meattle, Polar Lights, Mali, Aditi Ramesh, Bloodywood, FOI, Street Stories, Gaurav Tophakhane, Swarathma and others across the country in an effort to raise awareness on Mental Health and Wellness.

Members

Current members
Uddipan Sarmah – vocals, guitars (2013–present)
Robert Alex – bass (2015–present)
Sambit Chatterjee – drums, percussions (2017–present)

Former members
Gautam Deb – drums (2015–2019)
Shubham Gurung – guitars, keyboards (2013–2020)
Ashwin Naidu – drums (2013–2015)
Tushar Verma – bass (2013–2015)

Timeline

Discography

Studio albums
Khwaab (2015)

Zia (2017)

Rooh (2019)

Sleep (2020)

EPs
Growing Suspicions (2014)

IIII (2020)

Singles
At Long Last (2016)

The Tattva (Remastered) (2019)

References

External links
 Official Website

Indian indie rock groups
Post-rock groups
Musical groups established in 2013
2013 establishments in Gujarat